Martin Holm (November 27, 1976 – June 24, 2009) was a Swedish Muay Thai kickboxer and former WMC Muaythai World Champion. In K-1 he fought against some of the biggest stars at the time, like Ernesto Hoost, Ray Sefo, Michael McDonald and Glaube Feitosa.

Biography and career

When Martin Holm was seven years old, he started swimming in the local swimming school. A few years later he became interested in Aikido and practiced it for four years. Soon after he became interested in Shotokan Karate. When he was 14 he entered one of the best  Muay Thai gyms in Stockholm at that time, "Slagskeppet Muay Thai," where he met Jörgen Kruth and immediately was taken by the sport.

Martin was 18 years old and vacationing in Thailand with his trainer Po Lindvall and Jörgen Kruth when he had his first fight. He was not prepared for the fight but his opponent was an experienced local Muay Thai fighter. Holm attacked hard, fired a lot of shots and won the fight by a knockout with knee strikes at the 30 second mark in the first round. In 1998 or 1999 on the advice of his first trainer Po Lindvall Martin decided to follow his training friend Jorgen Kruth to Vallentuna Boxing Camp www.vbc.se, in an attempt to get to the next level as Lindvall was leaving his trainer carrier and VBC was the most excellent promoters of fighters at that time. From Vallentuna he had some professional fights and later entered K-1 two years after Kruth.

Holm fought over 30 times for Slagskeppet and his first trainer Po Lindvall and won 4 European and 3 World titles before earning a WMC World Title match in 1999 in Thailand.

In 2002, he made his K-1 debut at the K-1 World Grand Prix 2002 in Nagoya. He knocked out Namibian Jokki Oberholtzer at 1'38" in the first round. His next fight was against Brazilian karate practitioner Glaube Feitosa. Holm won again by a first round knock out.

In 2002, in Saitama, Japan, he faced his toughest opponent yet, K-1 superstar Ray Sefo from New Zealand. Holm lost the evenly fought battle by majority decision. He finished his rookie year in K-1 at the K-1 World Grand Prix 2002 Finals undercard against Canadian Michael McDonald.

In 2003, in Paris, Holm fought against four-time K-1 World Champion Ernesto Hoost and lost by unanimous decision.

In 2004, after his fight against Albanian Xhavit Bajrami, Martin Holm retired from fighting in order to focus on his family and newborn son.

After three years off, in January 2007, he announced he will be making his comeback to K-1.

Martin Holm was found dead at a playground outside of his home in Täby north of Stockholm on 24 June 2009. The cause of death was suicide by hanging from a swingset. Holm had been privately struggling with depression and an emotional imbalance.

Titles
 1994 WAKO Amateur Kickboxing European Champion
 1994 SIMTA Pro Muay Thai European Champion
 1995 WKA Amateur Kickboxing European Champion
 1997 WKA Amateur Kickboxing World Champion
 1998 IAMTF Amateur Muay Thai European Champion
 1999 IFMA Kings Cup Winner
 1999 WMC Pro Muay Thai World Champion

Kickboxing record (incomplete)

|-  bgcolor="#CCFFCC"
| 2006-04-24 || Win ||align=left| Tibor Nagy || MARS World Fighting GP || Seoul, Korea || Decision (unanimous) || 3 || 3:00 || 
|-
|-  bgcolor="#FFBBBB"
| 2004-06-06 || Loss ||align=left| Xhavit Bajrami || K-1 World Grand Prix 2004 in Nagoya || Nagoya, Japan || Decision (unanimous) || 3 || 3:00 || 
|-
|-  bgcolor="#CCFFCC"
| 2004-02-14 || Win ||align=left| Tibor Nagy || K-1 Scandinavia 2004 World Qualification || Solna, Sweden || Decision (unanimous) || 3 || 3:00 || 
|-
|-  bgcolor="#CCFFCC"
| 2003-12-06 || Win ||align=left| Jan Nortje || K-1 World Grand Prix 2003 || Tokyo, Japan || TKO (knee to the body) || 1 || 1:06 || 
|-
|-  bgcolor="#FFBBBB"
| 2003-06-14 || Loss ||align=left| Ernesto Hoost || K-1 World Grand Prix 2003 in Paris || Paris, France || Decision (unanimous) || 3 || 3:00 || 
|-
|-  bgcolor="#CCFFCC"
| 2003-03-15 || Win ||align=left| Petar Majstorovic || K-1 World Grand Prix 2003 Preliminary Scandinavia || Stockholm, Sweden || Decision (unanimous) || 5 || 3:00
|-
|-  bgcolor="#CCFFCC"
| 2002-12-07 || Win ||align=left| Michael McDonald || K-1 World Grand Prix 2002, Reserve Fight || Tokyo, Japan || Decision (majority) || 3 || 3:00 || 
|-
|-  bgcolor="#FFBBBB"
| 2002-10-05 || Loss ||align=left| Ray Sefo || K-1 World Grand Prix 2002 Final Elimination || Osaka, Japan || Decision (majority) || 3 || 3:00 || 
|-
! style=background:white colspan=9 |
|-
|-  bgcolor="#CCFFCC"
| 2002-07-14 || Win ||align=left| Glaube Feitosa || K-1 World Grand Prix 2002 in Fukuoka || Fukuoka, Japan || KO (punch) || 1 || 2:20 || 
|-
|-  bgcolor="#CCFFCC"
| 2002-03-03 || Win ||align=left| Jokki Oberholtzer || K-1 World Grand Prix 2002 in Nagoya || Nagoya, Japan || KO (left straight punch) || 1 || 1:38 || 
|-
|-  bgcolor="#CCFFCC"
| 2001-03-31 || Win ||align=left| Arnaund Bonin || Thaiboxing Night Helsinki || Nagoya, Japan || TKO (corner stoppage) || 2 ||  || 
|-
|-  bgcolor="#CCFFCC"
| 1999-11-? || Win ||align=left| Curka || WMC 1999 Championship || Phuket, Thailand || Decision (unanimous) || 5 || 3:00 || 
|-
! style=background:white colspan=9 |
|-
|-  bgcolor="#CCFFCC"
| 1999-04-02 || Win ||align=left| Victor Petrlik || International Sports House || Helsinki, Finland || TKO (corner stoppage) || 1 ||  || 
|-
|-  bgcolor="#CCFFCC"
| 1999-03-10 || Win ||align=left|  || Muay Thai event in Thailand || Bangkok, Thailand || KO (knee) || 1 || || 
|-  bgcolor="#CCFFCC"
| 1994-?-? || Win ||align=left|  || Muay Thai event in Thailand || Thailand || KO (knees) || 1 || 0:30 || 
|-
|-
| colspan=9 | Legend:

See also
List of K-1 events
List of male kickboxers

References

External links
Profile at K-1

1976 births
2009 suicides
Swedish male kickboxers
Heavyweight kickboxers
Swedish Muay Thai practitioners
Sportspeople from Stockholm
Suicides by hanging in Sweden